Freak Dance is an American comedy film written and directed by Matt Besser of the Upright Citizens Brigade and co-directed by Neil Mahoney. It premiered at the Austin Film Festival on October 21, 2011. The film had a limited theatrical release in May 2012 and made available on video on demand services. The film was released on DVD on July 10, 2012. The film is based on a stage show created by Besser, which originally ran at the Upright Citizens Brigade Theater in Los Angeles for several years.

Plot
Freak Dance is a musical, dance comedy where rich girl Cocolonia (Megan Heyn) must escape her uptight mother (Amy Poehler) who won't let her dance. So Cocolonia hits the streets to join a dance crew who respond to every challenge with a dance. With the help of dance crew leader Funky Bunch (Michael Daniel Cassady), who dreams of being the world's greatest dancer. The crew must save the Fantaseez Community Center from the evil "Building Inspector General" (Matt Besser) and the gang-banger dancers before it's too late. Will the Fantaseez Crew be able to save their home? Only love, and the Freak Dance can save them now.

Cast
Michael Daniel Cassady as Funky Bunch 
Megan Heyn as Cocolonia
Amy Poehler as Lillian
Matt Besser as The Building Inspector General
Ian Roberts as Dr. Starvos
Matt Walsh as Adolf Hitler, Jr.
Angela Trimbur as Sassy
Sam Riegel as Barrio
Drew Droege as Dazzle
Hal Rudnick as Asteroid
Benjamin Siemon as Egghead
Allen McLeod as Lint
Scott Rodgers as Spit
Tim Meadows as Irish Cop
Horatio Sanz as Barrio's Brother
Casey Wilson as Rich Lady
Danielle Schneider as Desk Nurse
Paul Rust as Weed Fiend
Andrew Daly as Gentleman Weed Fiend
James Adomian as Mickey Stardust, Zip Fleestreet, & Fraggle McWinkerbean
Charlie Sanders as Slaughterhouse Employee

External links
Official site

2011 films
2011 comedy films
2010s English-language films